Dama is a village in the As-Suwayda Governorate of southwest Syria. It is located in the heart of the Lejah lava plateau, 29 km north west of the city of As-Suwayda. According to the Syria Central Bureau of Statistics, Dama had a population of 1,799 in the 2004 census.

History
Dama and neighboring villages are thought to be the place where Saint Paul took refuge after escaping from Damascus.

The village, like most of the villages in Jabal ad-Druze, was an old Roman location. Many of its houses are still in their original condition. The inhabitants are mostly Druze and their main occupation is agriculture.

Ottoman era
In 1596 Dama appeared in the Ottoman tax registers as part of the nahiya of Bani Abdullah, in the Sanjak Hauran. It had an entirely Muslim population consisting of 74 households and 28 bachelors. The villagers paid a fixed tax rate of 40% on various agricultural products, including  wheat, barley, summer crops, goats and/or beehives; a total of 12,000 akçe.

In 1838, Dama was noted as a ruin, situated "in the Lejah itself", but also noted as "central point, which is considered the capital of Lejah".

Modern era
Dama played a major role in the late stages of the Great Syrian Revolution (1925-1927). It hosted the important Dama Convention which resulted in the refusal of French proposals and the collapse of negotiations between the Druze rebels and the French.
It was also the site of some of the last battles in the revolution fought by guerrilla groups led by Emir Adel Arslan.

See also
 Druze in Syria

References

Bibliography

External links
 Map of the town, Google Maps
Ezra-map

Populated places in Shahba District
Druze communities in Syria